Miha Mevlja (born 12 June 1990) is a Slovenian professional footballer who plays as a centre-back.

Club career
Mevlja began his career with Gorica, where he eventually spent four years with the first-team. In the summer of 2013 Mevlja joined Lausanne-Sport on a free transfer, his first club abroad, and competed in the Swiss Super League after signing a two-year contract.

On 31 August 2017, Mevlja signed a four-year contract with Zenit St. Petersburg. On 21 February 2019, he returned to Rostov on loan.

On 2 September 2019, he signed a two-year contract with PFC Sochi.

On 19 July 2021, he joined Turkish club Alanyaspor on a three-year contract.

On 8 September 2022, Mevlja returned to Russia and signed with Spartak Moscow for one season, with an option to extend for one more. On 18 January 2023, his contract with Spartak was terminated by mutual consent.

International career

During his spell with Dinamo București, he received his first call-up for the Slovenia national team and made his debut on 5 June 2016 in a friendly game against Turkey.

Personal life
He has a twin brother named Nejc, who plays as a centre-back.

Career statistics

Club

International 
Scores and results list Slovenia's goal tally first, score column indicates score after each Mevlja goal.

References

External links

 
 
 
 
 
 
 Miha Mevlja at NZS 

1990 births
Living people
Footballers from Ljubljana
Slovenian twins
Slovenian footballers
Slovenia youth international footballers
Slovenia under-21 international footballers
Slovenia international footballers
Association football defenders
ND Gorica players
NK Brda players
FC Lausanne-Sport players
Bnei Sakhnin F.C. players
FC Dinamo București players
FC Rostov players
FC Zenit Saint Petersburg players
PFC Sochi players
Alanyaspor footballers
FC Spartak Moscow players
Slovenian PrvaLiga players
Swiss Super League players
Israeli Premier League players
Liga I players
Russian Premier League players
Süper Lig players
Slovenian expatriate footballers
Expatriate footballers in Switzerland
Slovenian expatriate sportspeople in Switzerland
Expatriate footballers in Israel
Slovenian expatriate sportspeople in Israel
Expatriate footballers in Romania
Slovenian expatriate sportspeople in Romania
Expatriate footballers in Russia
Slovenian expatriate sportspeople in Russia
Expatriate footballers in Turkey
Slovenian expatriate sportspeople in Turkey